The 1972 Australian Sports Car Championship was an Australian motor racing series for Sports Cars. It was sanctioned by the Confederation of Australian Motor Sport as a national title and was the fourth Australian Sports Car Championship.

The championship was won by John Harvey driving a McLaren M6 Repco.

Schedule
The championship was contested over six rounds:

Classes and points system
The championship was open to:
 Group A Sports Cars (Open)
 Group B Sports Cars (Closed)
 Group D Production Sports Cars

Cars competed in two classes, Over 2500cc and Up to 2500cc.

Points were awarded on a 9-6-4-3-2-1 basis to the first six placegetters in each class at each round and on a 4-3-2-1 basis to the first four outright placegetters at each round.

Championship standings

References 

 A History Of Australian Motor Sport (1980)
 Around The Houses (1980)
 Autopics

Australian Sports Car Championship
Sports Car Championship